Manpur Junction railway station is a railway junction station on Gaya–Kiul line of Delhi–Kolkata Main Line in East Central Railway zone under Mughalsarai railway division of the Indian Railways. The railway station is situated at Kamalpur, Manpur in Gaya district in the Indian state of Bihar.

References 

Railway stations in Gaya district
Mughalsarai railway division
Railway junction stations in Bihar
Railway stations in India opened in 1879